Timothée Clément (born 8 April 2000) is a French field hockey player who plays as a midielder or forward for Belgian Hockey League club Gantoise and the French national team.

Club career
Clément came through the youth ranks of Montrouge where he played until 2020 when he moved to Belgium to play for Royal Orée. He left Orée in 2022 to play for Gantoise whom he joined together with his brother Mathis.

International career

Junior national team
Timothée Clément made his debut for the French U–21 team in 2017. He represented the side at the EuroHockey Junior Championship II in Saint Petersburg, where he won a gold medal.

He represented the team again in 2019 at the EuroHockey Junior Championship in Valencia. 

In 2021, he captained the team at the FIH Junior World Cup in Bhubaneswar. In the opening match, he scored a hat-trick in a 5–4 win over defending champions India.

In October 2022 he has elected rising star of the year after being best player in junior World Cup 2021, second top scorer in junior World Cup 2021 and top scorer in qualifying for the 2023 European cup in Calais.

Les Bleus
A year after his junior debut, Clément debuted for Les Bleus in a test match against England in Wattignies.  Later that year he represented the team at the 2018 FIH World Cup in Bhubaneswar, where the team finished eighth.

Since his debut, Clément has been a regular inclusion in the men's national team.

References

External links

2000 births
Living people
French male field hockey players
Male field hockey midfielders
Male field hockey forwards
2018 Men's Hockey World Cup players
Men's Belgian Hockey League players
Field hockey players from Paris
La Gantoise HC players